Mahmudabad (also Romanized as Maḩmūdābād) is a village in Hablerud Rural District, in the Central District of Firuzkuh County, Tehran Province, Iran. At the 2006 census, its population was 307, in 91 families. The people of this village are gardener. This village is pomegranate pole of Tehran Province.

References 

Populated places in Firuzkuh County